The 2020 British Figure Skating Championships were held from 26 November to 1 December 2019 at the IceSheffield in Sheffield. BBC Sport provided live coverage throughout the competition. Medals were awarded in the disciplines of men's singles, ladies' singles, pair skating, and ice dance at the senior, junior, and novice levels. The results were among the criteria used to determine international assignments.

Medalists

Senior

Junior

Senior results

Men

Ladies

Pairs

Ice dance

Junior results

Men

Ladies

Ice dance

International team selections

World Championships
The 2020 World Championships were scheduled to be held in Montreal, Quebec, Canada from 16 to 22 March 2020. However, the competition was cancelled due to the COVID-19 pandemic.

European Championships
The 2020 European Championships were held in Graz, Austria from 20 to 26 January 2020.

World Junior Championships
The 2020 World Junior Championships were held in Tallinn, Estonia from 2–8 March 2020.

References

External links
 2020 British Championships results

British Figure Skating Championships, 2020
British Figure Skating Championships
Figure Skating Championships